Leonard Stewart (19 September 1907 – 2 November 1995) was a British speed skater. He competed in three events at the 1928 Winter Olympics.

References

1907 births
1995 deaths
British male speed skaters
Olympic speed skaters of Great Britain
Speed skaters at the 1928 Winter Olympics
People from Islington (district)